Parker may refer to:

Persons
 Parker (given name)
 Parker (surname)

Places

Place names in the United States
Parker, Arizona
Parker, Colorado
Parker, Florida
Parker, Idaho
Parker, Kansas
Parker, Missouri
Parker, North Carolina
Parker, Pennsylvania
Parker, South Carolina
Parker, South Dakota
Parker, Texas in Collin County
Parker, Johnson County, Texas
Parker, Washington
Parker City, Indiana
Parker County, Texas
Parker Dam, at Lake Havasu on the Colorado River between Arizona and California
Parker Road (DART station), a light rail terminal on Parker Road in Plano, Texas
Parker School, Montana
Parker Strip, Arizona
Parker Township, Marshall County, Minnesota
Parker Township, Morrison County, Minnesota
Parker Township, Butler County, Pennsylvania
Parker Center, a former police building in Los Angeles

Elsewhere
 C. W. Parker Carousel, a Burnaby Village Museum exhibit in British Columbia, Canada
 Mount Parker (Philippines), a Mindanao island volcano of the Philippines
 Parker Pass, Antarctica
 Parker Place, an Asian-themed shopping mall in Richmond, British Columbia, Canada

Companies
Parker Brothers, toy and game manufacturer
Parker Bros. (also known as Parker Brothers Gun Company)
Parker Guitars
Parker Hannifin, manufacturer of motion and control technologies
Parker and Lee, public relations firm
Parker Manufacturing Company, a manufacturer of machine tools and kitchen cabinets, and an industrial landlord
Parker Pen Company, a maker of fine pens and pencils

Schools
 George S. Parker High School, Janesville, Wisconsin, USA
 Francis W. Parker Charter Essential School, Devens, Massachusetts, USA
 Parker Academy, Concord, New Hampshire, USA

Other 
 ARA Parker (P-44), an Espora-class corvette serving in the Argentine Navy 
 Fort Parker massacre, at Parker's Fort, Texas
 Mrs. Parker and the Vicious Circle
 Parker, a player of park golf
 Parker (1984 film), a 1984 British crime film
 Parker (2013 film), a 2013 crime thriller film
 Parker (Stark novels character), a fictional character and franchise created by Donald E. Westlake
 Aloysius Parker, a fictional character from the 1960s Thunderbirds British TV series, known mononymously as "Parker"
 Parker immunity doctrine, a principle in antitrust law in the United States
 Parker v. Brown, the United States Supreme Court decision that gave rise to the foregoing
 Parker Morris Committee and the Parker Morris Standards
 Parker truss, type of bridge design
 Parker Solar Probe, spacecraft which probed the outer corona of the Sun (launched by NASA in 2018)

See also
Parkers (disambiguation)
Justice Parker (disambiguation)
Parka, a type of hooded anorak